Hoplomyzon atrizona is a species of banjo catfish endemic to the Lake Maracaibo basin in Venezuela.  It grows to a length of 2.7 cm.

References 

 

Aspredinidae
Fish of Venezuela
Endemic fauna of Venezuela
Taxa named by George S. Myers
Fish described in 1942